The mixed pairs all-around competition at the 2017 World Games held in Wrocław was played on 24 July. 12 acrobatic gymnastics competitors from 6 nations participated in the . The acrobatic gymnastics competition took place at Centennial Hall in Lower Silesian Voivodeship.

Competition format
The top 4 teams in qualifications, based on combined scores of each round, advanced to the final. The scores in qualification do not count in the final.

Qualification

Final

Final standing

Medalists

See also
Acrobatic gymnastics at the 2017 World Games – Men's pairs all-around
Acrobatic gymnastics at the 2017 World Games – Women's pairs all-around

References
Qualification round balance results
Qualification round dynamic results
Final round results

External links
 Result on IWGA website

Mixed pairs all-around